Paul Za'im, known sometime also as Paul of Aleppo (Paul, Archdeacon of Aleppo) (1627–1669) was an Ottoman Syrian Orthodox clergyman and chronicler. Son of Patriarch Macarius III Ibn al-Za'im, Paul accompanied his father in his travels throughout Constantinople, Wallachia, Moldavia, Ukraine and Russia, as an attempt to raise funds and support for their Church (from 1652 to 1659, and from 1666 to 1669).

Life and works
He was born in 1627 in Aleppo, the same year his mother died. He was appointed a reader on May 8, 1642. On February 17, 1644, he married, and on November 21, 1647, he was ordained archdeacon. He died in Tiflis, Georgia on January 30, 1669.

Paul wrote down an account of his visits, The Travels of Macarius, Patriarch of Antioch (edited in Arabic). It is important as a source on Wallachia, documenting the main events of Constantin Şerban's rule and the Ottoman expedition of 1657. He wrote also a History of the Patriarchs of Antioch.

Notes

External links 
The fall of Minsk to the Russians (1655) as witnessed by Paul of Aleppo
Paul of Aleppo's account of Wallachia
Adam Olearius, Paul of Aleppo and Nikolas Witsen about Russian Patriarch Nikon
Paul of Aleppo on the construction of the Bucharest Cathedral (in Romanian)
Paul of Aleppo 

17th-century historians from the Ottoman Empire
Greek Orthodox Christians from the Ottoman Empire
1627 births
1669 deaths
People from Aleppo
17th-century travel writers
History of Wallachia
17th-century explorers
Greek Orthodox Church of Antioch
History of Moldova
History of Ukraine
Khmelnytsky Uprising
Grand Duchy of Moscow